Zhang Xin (born 4 August 1985) is a Chinese freestyle skier, specializing in aerials.

Career
Zhang competed at the 2014 Winter Olympics for China. She placed 17th in the first qualifying round in the aerials, failing to advance. She subsequently placed 7th in the second qualification round, again not advancing.

As of September 2015, her best showing at the World Championships is 12th, in the 2013 aerials.

Zhang made her World Cup debut in February 2004. As of September 2015, she has three World Cup wins, with the first coming at Beida Lake in 2010–11. Her best World Cup overall finish in aerials is 2nd, in 2013–14.

World Cup Podiums

References

1985 births
Living people
Olympic freestyle skiers of China
Freestyle skiers at the 2014 Winter Olympics
Freestyle skiers at the 2018 Winter Olympics
Sportspeople from Anshan
Chinese female freestyle skiers
Medalists at the 2018 Winter Olympics
Olympic silver medalists for China
Olympic medalists in freestyle skiing
Asian Games medalists in freestyle skiing
Freestyle skiers at the 2007 Asian Winter Games
Freestyle skiers at the 2011 Asian Winter Games
Asian Games gold medalists for China
Asian Games bronze medalists for China
Medalists at the 2007 Asian Winter Games
Medalists at the 2011 Asian Winter Games
Skiers from Liaoning